Jamie Fielding (born 18 August 1999) is an English professional footballer who plays as a defender for Tonbridge Angels.

Career

Hastings United
Fielding progressed through Eastbourne Borough's youth academy before signing with Isthmian League club Hastings United in 2017. He joined Little Common of the Southern Combination League Division One on loan to gain first-team experience during the latter stages of 2017. He returned to his parent club and made his first-team debut for Hastings at the age of 18, coming on as a 90th-minute substitute in the club's 1–0 victory over Walton Casuals on 17 March 2018. Fielding scored his first goal for the club in a 3–1 win away at Chipstead on 7 April 2018. He went on to make eight appearances during the remainder of the 2017–18 season. The 2018–19 season would prove to be Fielding's breakthrough season in terms of regular first-team appearances; playing 35 times in all competitions, scoring two goals. He was named Hasting United's Young Player of the Year at the club's end-of-season awards ceremony. Fielding went on a one-week trial with Premier League club Leicester City, although no move materialised.

Stevenage
Fielding received contract offers from Forest Green Rovers and Stevenage of League Two in May 2019. He opted to sign for Stevenage on 22 May 2019. Fielding stated Stevenage's high level training facilities were a decisive factor in choosing to sign for the club. He made his debut in the club's first game of the 2019–20 season, playing the first-half in a 2–0 away defeat to Salford City on 3 August 2019. Having made six appearances during the first three months of the season, Fielding joined National League South club St Albans City on a three-month loan agreement on 15 November 2019. The loan was extended for the remainder of the season on 17 January 2020. Fielding made 15 appearances in all competitions during the loan spell. He joined Braintree Town of the National League South on loan in September 2020.

Wealdstone
On 5 April 2021, Fielding signed for National League side Wealdstone on a short term deal.

Tonbridge Angels
He moved to Tonbridge Angels in September 2021.

Career statistics

References

1990s births
Living people
English footballers
Eastbourne Borough F.C. players
Little Common F.C. players
Hastings United F.C. players
Stevenage F.C. players
Association football defenders
English Football League players
St Albans City F.C. players
Braintree Town F.C. players
National League (English football) players
Wealdstone F.C. players
Tonbridge Angels F.C. players